Welsford (2001 pop.: 562) is a Canadian rural community in Queens County, New Brunswick.

Located in the Nerepis River valley at the foot of Mount Douglas, Welsford is north of Nerepis, New Brunswick and the town of Grand Bay-Westfield.

History

Named after Captain Welsford who died a hero in the Crimean War and was commemorated with the Welsford-Parker Monument.

Notable people

See also
List of communities in New Brunswick

References

Communities in Queens County, New Brunswick